Odites citromela is a moth in the family Depressariidae. It was described by Edward Meyrick in 1923. It is found in Angola.

References

Endemic fauna of Angola
Moths described in 1923
Odites
Taxa named by Edward Meyrick